James Gallier Jr. (September 25, 1827 – May 16, 1868), was a prominent architect in New Orleans, Louisiana. His father, James Gallier was also a New Orleans architect.

James Gallier Jr. graduated from the University of North Carolina in 1848, and the following year he succeeded to his father's architectural firm. In 1853, he married Josephine A. Villavaso of St. Bernard Parish, Louisiana. The couple had four daughters. During the Civil War, Gallier served in the Orleans Light Horse Louisiana Cavalry.

He died at age 40 just a few years after the Civil War. New Orleans was experiencing a yellow fever epidemic during this period; it is likely that Gallier succumbed to the disease.

Significant works
 The Third Christ Church Cathedral on Canal Street (1846).  No longer exists.
 Preservation Resource Center (Leeds Iron Foundry, 1852), on Tchoupitoulas Street.
 Gallier House (1857), on Royal Street in the French Quarter.  A National Historic Landmark.
 French Opera House (1859), on Bourbon Street in the French Quarter. Burned down in 1919.
 The Luling Mansion (1865), 1436 Leda Street, converted to the Louisiana Jockey Club (1871-1905).

References

External links
Southeastern Architectural Archive, Special Collections Division, Tulane University
Portrait of James Gallier Jr., in KnowLA, Encyclopedia of Louisiana

1829 births
1870 deaths
19th-century American architects
Deaths from yellow fever
British emigrants to the United States